The 2011 Brazilian Grand Prix (formally the Formula 1 Grande Prêmio Petrobras do Brasil 2011) was a Formula One motor race held on 27 November 2011 at the Autódromo José Carlos Pace, Interlagos, in São Paulo, Brazil. It was the nineteenth and final round of the 2011 Formula One season. The 71-lap race was won by Red Bull Racing driver Mark Webber. Sebastian Vettel, Webber's teammate finished in second place to complete Red Bull's third 1–2 of the season; Jenson Button finished in third position, to complete the podium for the McLaren team.

It was the 326th and final race for 11-time Grand Prix winner and most experienced Formula One driver at that point in history, Rubens Barrichello, and the 256th and last race for Jarno Trulli. This would also prove to be the final Grand Prix for Vitantonio Liuzzi, Sebastien Buemi and Jaime Alguersuari, as well as the last race for Renault until the 2016 Australian Grand Prix.

Report

Background
After replacing Jaime Alguersuari during the first Friday practice session in South Korea and Sébastien Buemi during the same session in Abu Dhabi, Formula Renault 3.5 runner-up Jean-Éric Vergne once again drove for Toro Rosso on Friday morning, after a statement announced he would take the place of "whichever of the Toro Rosso drivers has the least points"; Vergne ultimately replaced Buemi. Having completed the sufficient amount of mileage in order to acquire an FIA Super Licence at the Young Driver Test in Abu Dhabi, Jan Charouz took part in first practice for HRT, replacing Vitantonio Liuzzi. Romain Grosjean drove in the place of Vitaly Petrov at Renault, while Luiz Razia replaced Jarno Trulli at Lotus and Nico Hülkenberg drove Adrian Sutil's Force India. With Liuzzi and Trulli on the sidelines, the first practice session became the first time since the 2005 United States Grand Prix that an Italian driver had not taken part in a timed session.

The circuit included one Drag Reduction System (DRS) zone, located along Reta Oposta. According to FIA race director Charlie Whiting, Reta Oposta was chosen for the DRS zone because "the main straight usually gives a good enough opportunity to overtake anyway, [and] we don't want to make it too easy [to pass]".

After experimenting with a new compound of soft tyre during free practice in Abu Dhabi, Pirelli announced that the tyre would be used for the race in Brazil.

Qualifying

Webber qualified in second place, just one tenth of a second slower than his Red Bull teammate. The two McLarens took over the second row of the grid, with Button ahead of Hamilton. Fernando Alonso and Nico Rosberg were on the third row of the grid, separated by half a second. Felipe Massa, Alonso's Ferrari teammate, qualified seventh ahead of Adrian Sutil, Bruno Senna and Michael Schumacher (who didn't set a time).

Race

Vettel lead the race after the start, but conceded the lead to Webber when his gearbox started causing him trouble. Vettel remained second in the race though, while Webber took his first, and only, win of the season. None of the other teams could match the pace of Red Bull in the race. Button managed to complete the podium with third position after being overtaken by Alonso early on in the race, but repassing him near the end. Alonso eventually finished fourth whilst Hamilton retired with a gearbox issue. Massa completed the year with a fifth-place finish. Sutil, Rosberg, di Resta, Kobayashi and Petrov completed the points scoring positions.

Bruno Senna received a drive through penalty after colliding with Michael Schumacher at the entry of the "Senna S" on lap 10.

Post-race
Jenson Button's podium meant that he stayed second in the Drivers' Championship, while Webber's victory meant he overtook Alonso to become third. Despite both their drivers finishing well inside the points scoring positions, Force India did not manage to overturn Renault's points total to take fifth place in the standings, and were left just four points behind. Kamui Kobayashi scored two points for Sauber to ensure that they kept seventh place in the standings as well.

Classification

Qualifying

Race

Championship standings after the race 
Bold text indicates the World Champions.

Drivers' Championship standings

Constructors' Championship standings

 Note: Only the top five positions are included for both sets of standings.

References

External links
Detailed Brazilian Grand Prix results (archived)

Brazilian
Brazilian Grand Prix
Grand Prix
Brazilian Grand Prix